The Aurora mountain skink (Parvoscincus tagapayo)  is a species of lizard in the family Scincidae. The species is endemic to the Philippines.

Etymology
The specific name, tagapayo, is a Tagalog word meaning "wise entrusted friend, advisor, or mentor", referring to American herpetologist Walter Creighton Brown, in whose honor this species is named.

Geographic range
P. tagapayo is found on the island of Luzon, Philippines.

Habitat

Reproduction
The mode of reproduction of P. tagapayo is unknown.

References

Further reading
Brown RM, McGuire JA, Ferner JW, Alcala AC (19999). "New Species of Diminutive Scincid Lizard (Squamata: Lygosominae: Sphenomorphus) from Luzon Island, Republic of the Philippines". Copeia 1999 (2): 362–370. (Sphenomorphus tagapayo, new species).
Brown RM, McGuire JA, Ferner JW, Icarangal N, Kennedy RS (2000). "Amphibians and reptiles of Luzon Island, II: preliminary report on the herpetofauna of Aurora Memorial National Park, Philippines". Hamadryad 25 (2): 175–195.
Linkem CW, Diesmos AC, Brown RM (2011). "Molecular systematics of the Philippine forest skinks (Squamata: Scincidae: Sphenomorphus): testing morphological hypotheses of interspecific relationships". Zoological Journal of the Linnean Society 163: 1217–1243. (Parvoscincus tagapayo, new combination).

Parvoscincus
Reptiles described in 1999
Taxa named by Rafe M. Brown
Taxa named by Jimmy Adair McGuire
Taxa named by John W. Ferner
Taxa named by Angel Chua Alcala